Werner F. Korte (1906–1982) was a German musicologist who in 1932 was appointed head of the Seminar of Musicology at the University of Münster.

References

Further reading 
 Manfred Günnigmann: Werner Korte und die Musikwissenschaft an der Universität Münster 1932 bis 1973. Universitätsarchiv Münster). Aschendorff Verlag, Münster 2015, .
 Thomas Phleps: Ein stiller, verbissener und zäher Kampf um Stetigkeit – Musikwissenschaft in NS-Deutschland und ihre vergangenheitspolitische Bewältigung. In: Isolde von Foerster et al. (ed.), Musikforschung – Nationalsozialismus – Faschismus, Mainz 2001, .
 Manfred Günnigmann: Dem Zeitgeist angepasst. Musikwissenschaft an der Westfälischen Wilhelms-Universität 1922 bis 1962. In: Hans-Ulrich Thamer/Daniel Droste/Sabine Happ (ed.): Die Universität Münster im Nationalsozialismus. Kontinuitäten und Brüche zwischen 1920 bis 1960 (Universitätsarchiv Münster). Aschendorff Verlag, Münster 2012, .

External links
 Bedeutende Schätze für das Musikarchiv

1906 births
1982 deaths
Academic staff of the University of Münster
Place of birth missing
20th-century German musicologists